The Baakens River, also known as Gqeberha River, is a river that empties at Port Elizabeth's city center and harbor in Algoa Bay.

Mostly, it is a small quiet stream. Near its mouth, it runs into a gorge on the south side of the hill on which Fort Frederick lies.

Until the first VOC ships docked here in 1690, the creek was known by the Khoekhoe name , the rocky creek. In 1752, ensign August Frederik Beutler passed by and erected a beacon (baken in contemporary Dutch) on behalf of the VOC at the estuary.

In time, the last  of the stream was canalized and the small lagoon filled up. Parks, sports grounds and hiking trails have been laid out in parts of the Baakens Valley. The 54 ha Settler Park has existed since 1938. The valley was in the years 1867, 1897, 1908, 1968, 1981 and 2006 the scene of severe floods, floods and great damage. On 5 May 1897, the cause was a cloudburst at Hunter's Retreat. On Sunday 1 September 1968, it started to rain just after 8am and within a short time more than 56 cm fell. In the most devastating flood that South Africa had experienced until then, 8 people lost their lives.

 is the name for this river in Xhosa. The neighborhood Kabega Park may have been named after this river.

See also
 List of rivers in South Africa

References 

Rivers of the Eastern Cape